Clint Conque (born July 14, 1961) is a retired American college football coach and former player. Conque was the head football coach at the University of Central Arkansas (UCA) from 2000 to 2013 and served in the same capacity at the Stephen F. Austin State University (SFA) from 2014 to 2017.

Playing career
Conque played collegiately at Southwest Mississippi Community College and then Nicholls State University where he was named first-team Associated Press All-American in 1982. He played for the Los Angeles Raiders in the NFL in 1983.

Coaching career

High School career
Conque was defensive coordinator at Rayne High School in Rayne, Louisiana in 1985 and offensive coordinator at St. Thomas More High School in Lafayette, Louisiana in 1986.

College career

Early career
Conque began his college coaching career as a graduate assistant at his alma mater, Nicholls State University in 1984. After spending two years at the high school level, he returned to college coaching as both a running backs and linebackers coach at McNeese State University from 1987 to 1989. In 1990, Conque moved to Samford University as running backs coach and held that position until 1992. In 1993, Conque became running backs and inside wide receivers coach at Louisiana Tech through 1994. In 1995, he dropped coaching inside wide receivers and continued to focus on coaching running backs. From 1996 to 1998, Conque added special teams coordinator to his role as running backs coach. In 1999, Conque became offensive coordinator along with being running backs coach.

Central Arkansas
Conque was head football coach at the University of Central Arkansas from 2000 to 2013, compiling a record of 105 wins and 59 losses. After Conque left for Stephen F. Austin, he was replaced as head football coach by Steve Campbell.

Stephen F. Austin
Conque was hired as head football coach at Stephen F. Austin State University (SFA) in December 2013. In his first season at SFA, Conque helped guide the Lumberjacks to an 8-5 record, a five-win improvement from the 3-9 mark during the 2013 season. Conque was 5-3 in Southland Conference games, including wins over sixth-ranked McNeese State and eighth-ranked Southeastern Louisiana, finishing tied for third. Conque was named the SLC Coach of the Year, leading the Lumberjacks to the FCS playoffs for the first time since 2010. He also helped mentor senior Gus Johnson to a record-setting year as Johnson was named the SLC Player of the Year and finished ninth in the Walter Payton Award voting.

On June 18, 2018, Conque was suspended indefinitely as the head coach at Stephen F. Austin State University. According to the university statement, "Stephen F. Austin State University has suspended head football coach Clint Conque pending an investigation into alleged violations of university policy. Jeff Byrd was named interim head coach.

Conque announced his resignation on August 6, 2018 stating “Although I have remained confident in the ongoing investigation into the potential violation of university policy, as a family of faith and out of respect to my profession, I do not want this situation to be a further distraction to the 2018 football team and season." He finished with a record of 21 wins and 25 losses at Stephen F. Austin.

Head coaching record

References

External links
 Stephen F. Austin profile

1961 births
Living people
All-American college football players
American football linebackers
Central Arkansas Bears football coaches
High school football coaches in Louisiana
Louisiana Tech Bulldogs football coaches
McNeese Cowboys football coaches
Nicholls Colonels football coaches
Nicholls Colonels football players
Samford Bulldogs football coaches
Southwest Mississippi Bears football players
Players of American football from Baton Rouge, Louisiana
Stephen F. Austin Lumberjacks football coaches